is a passenger railway station in the town of  Naganohara, Gunma Prefecture, Japan, operated by East Japan Railway Company (JR East).

Lines
Haneo Station is a station on the Agatsuma Line, and is located 46.4 rail kilometers from the opposing terminus of the line at Shibukawa Station.

Station layout
The station consists of a single island platform on an embankment, accessed from underneath. There is a weather shelter on the platform but no station building. The station is unattended.

Platforms

History
Haneo Station was opened on 7 March 1971. The station was absorbed into the JR East network upon the privatization of the Japanese National Railways (JNR) on 1 April 1987.

Surrounding area
 
 
 
 Agatsuma River

See also
 List of railway stations in Japan

External links

 JR East Station information 

Railway stations in Gunma Prefecture
Agatsuma Line
Stations of East Japan Railway Company
Railway stations in Japan opened in 1971
Naganohara, Gunma